Péricles da Silva Nunes (born 24 March 1994), simply known as Péricles, is a Brazilian footballer who plays for Goiás as a defensive midfielder.

Club career
Born in Goiânia, Goiás, Péricles graduated with Goiás' youth setup, and made his senior debuts while on loan at Aparecidense in 2012. On 7 January 2015, he was promoted to the main squad by manager Wagner Lopes.

On 16 May 2015 Péricles made his Série A debut, starting in a 2–0 home win against Atlético Paranaense.

References

External links

1994 births
Living people
Sportspeople from Goiânia
Brazilian footballers
Association football midfielders
Campeonato Brasileiro Série A players
Campeonato Brasileiro Série D players
Goiás Esporte Clube players